Facebook F8 is a mostly-annual conference held by Meta Platforms (formerly Facebook) since 2007, intended for developers and entrepreneurs who build products and services around the website. The event has generally started with a keynote speech by Facebook founder Mark Zuckerberg, followed by various breakout sessions concentrating on specific topics. Facebook has often introduced new features and made new announcements at the conference.

The "F8" name comes from Facebook's tradition of 8 hour hackathons.

Facebook F8 was hosted in San Francisco, California from 2007 to 2016, then in a more central Silicon Valley location in San Jose, California from 2017 to 2019. In 2020 and 2021, it was a virtual event due to the COVID-19 pandemic. There was no F8 event in 2009, 2012, 2013 or 2022. The 2022 event was replaced by an event called Conversations, focusing on the metaverse.

2007

The first F8 event was held on May 24, 2007, at the San Francisco Design Center in San Francisco. The notion of the social graph was introduced.

2008
The 2008 F8 event was held on July 23, 2008, at the San Francisco Design Center once again. News and announcements from this event included:

 Introducing the New Facebook Profile & More
 Integrating Facebook Connect into your Website

2010
The 2010 F8 event was held on April 21, 2010 at the San Francisco Design Center. The main announcement was the feature to add a “Like” button to any piece of content on a website by the owner. This feature is now integrated within around 2.5 million websites worldwide, with 10,000 more being added daily.

Additional news and announcements included:

 Social Plugins (e.g. Like button)
 Open Graph Protocol
 Graph API
 OAuth 2.0

2011
F8 2011 was held on September 22, 2011. Various things Facebook introduced at the conference included a new profile redesign named 'Timeline' that showed a history of user's activity on their profile, and a broader, more advanced version of the 'Open Graph' protocol.

The F8 2011 event was mainly focused on introducing new products, transforming industries, building and growing social applications and product Q&A. Some of the details of the topics were:

 The Future of Digital Music
 Mobile + Social	
 The Rise of Social Gaming
 Investing in Social	
 Developing Products at Facebook	
 Social Design	
 Distribution: Growing on Facebook	
 Marketing on Facebook	
 Hack Better: New Tools for Developers	
 Inside HTML5 Development at Facebook	
 Making Fast Social Apps

2014

F8 2014 was announced on March 8, 2014 by Facebook representative Ilya Sukhar that the F8 event would return on April 30.

The conference was focused on Facebook's strategy to become a 'cross-platform platform'.

Here is a list of the main topics:

 Audience Network
 Autofill With Facebook
 Anonymous Login
 Removing The Ability To Pull Friends' Data
 Granular Mobile Privacy Permissions
 2-Year Core API Stability Guarantee
 Graph API 2.0
 FbStart
 Mobile Like Button
 Send to Mobile
 Message Dialog
 AppLinks
 Visualization APIs For Media
 Pricing changes
 Analytics and Offline Storage
 Internet.org Innovation Lab
 DisplayNode

2015

The 2015 F8 conference was held on March 25, 2015 at the Fort Mason Center.

2016
The 2016 F8 conference was held on April 12 and 13, 2016.

Announcements: Facebook Analytics adds push and in app notifications feature

2017
The 2017 F8 conference was held on April 18 and 19, 2017, at the San Jose Convention Center in San Jose, California. Announcements included:
 Integrating the camera more into Facebook and Messenger, including more 360° features
 New augmented reality platform, challenging Snapchat
 Facebook Messenger: chat extensions including Spotify, Apple Music, and Aeromexico - which are called up by the user but do not chat in groups; improved discovery, further integration of M (virtual assistant)
 Virtual reality hangout app for Oculus Rift
 Deep learning framework Caffe2
 New 360° surround cameras
 Helicopters that provide internet via fiber optic cable
 Building 8 project aiming to allow people to type straight from their brain and hear through their skin

2018
The 2018 F8 conference was held on the first two days of May 2018 at the McEnery Convention Center in San Jose, California. At the conference, Facebook announced the creation of their own online dating service. Shares in the dating business Match Group fell by 22% after the announcement. Announcements included:

 Facebook's mission being to "defy distance"
 Hugo Barra opened up his keynote talk mentioning Itaipu VR, produced by a Brazilian developer, Imersys.

2019
The 2019 F8 conference was held at the end of April 2019 and the beginning of May 2019 at the McEnery Convention Center in San Jose, California. During the keynote, Mark Zuckerberg announced: "The future is private."

2020
The 2020 F8 conference was held on April 25, 2020 as a virtual event due to the COVID-19 pandemic.

2021
The 2021 F8 conference, AKA F8 Refresh, was held on June 2-3, 2021 as another virtual event.

2022
The 2022 F8 conference was canceled on April 6 in favor of Conversations, which was held on May 19 as a virtual event, focused on Meta Platforms' virtual reality Metaverse initiative.

References

Further reading
 Barnett, Emma, "Facebook f8: Zuckerberg announces revamp: Facebook's founder and CEO, Mark Zuckerberg, has announced a host of changes to the site at the social network's f8 conference in San Francisco", The Telegraph (London), September 22, 2011.

External links

Facebook
Web-related conferences
Events in San Francisco
South of Market, San Francisco
Recurring events established in 2007
Software development events
2007 establishments in California